High Stakes & Dangerous Men  is the thirteenth album by British hard rock band UFO, released in February 1992.  It is the only UFO studio album to feature guitarist Laurence Archer and drummer Clive Edwards, both former members of Wild Horses.

Track listing
All songs written by Phil Mogg, Pete Way, and Laurence Archer, except where indicated.

Personnel
UFO
Phil Mogg - vocals
Laurence Archer - guitar, backing vocals
Pete Way - bass guitar
Clive Edwards - drums

Additional musicians
Don Airey – keyboards
Terry Reid, Stevie Lange - backing vocals

Production
Kit Woolven - producer, engineer, arrangements with UFO

References

UFO (band) albums
1992 albums
Castle Communications albums